The 2012 U.S. House of Representatives elections in Connecticut were held on Tuesday, November 6, 2012, to elect the five congressional representatives from the state, one from each of the state's five congressional districts. The elections coincided with the elections of other federal and state offices, including a quadrennial presidential election, a U.S. Senate election, and state legislature races.

Primaries to select Republican and Democratic candidates in some districts were held on Tuesday, August 14, 2012.

The Democratic Party candidate won in each of the five districts on Election Day.

Overview
The table below shows the total number and percentage of votes, as well as the number of seats gained and lost by each political party in the election for the United States House of Representatives in Connecticut. In addition, the voter turnout and the number of votes not valid will be listed below.   

 *Includes 66,883 votes received on the line of the Connecticut Working Families Party, which cross-endorsed

District 1

Democratic incumbent John Larson, who has represented the 1st district since 1999, sought re-election

Democratic primary

Candidates

Nominee
John Larson, incumbent U.S. Representative

Republican primary

Candidates

Nominee
John Decker, financial planner

Eliminated in primary
Mike McDonald, member of the Windsor Town Council,

Results
Decker won the nomination at the Republican state convention on May 18, garnering 69% of available delegates.

General election

Results

District 2

Democratic incumbent Joe Courtney, who has represented the 2nd district since 2007, said in February 2011 that he would not run for the U.S. Senate seat to be vacated by Joe Lieberman. Courtney ran for re-election.

Democratic primary

Candidates

Nominee
Joe Courtney, incumbent U.S. Representative

Republican primary

Candidates

Nominee
Paul Formica, First selectman of the East Lyme Board of Selectmen

Eliminated in primary
Doug Dubitsky, lawyer and candidate for this seat in 2010
Daria Novak, business consultant and former State Department employee and candidate for this seat in 2010

Withdrawn
Christopher Coutu, state representative

Primary results
At the Republican state convention on May 18, delegates in the second district endorsed Formica. Formica and Novak took part in the August 14 primary, which Formica won.

General election

Results

District 3
 
Democratic incumbent Rosa DeLauro, who has represented the 3rd district since 1991 ran for re-election.

Democratic primary

Candidates

Nominee
Rosa DeLauro, incumbent U.S. Representative

Republican primary

Candidates

Nominee
Wayne Winsley, Motivational speaker

Eliminated in primary
Steve Packard

Results
At the Republican state convention on May 18, delegates in the third district endorsed Winsley. Following the Republican state convention, Steve Packard announced his intention to run for the office as an independent.

General election

Results

District 4

Democratic incumbent Jim Himes, who has represented the 4th district since 2009, said in December 2010 that he would not run for the U.S. Senate in 2012.  Himes ran for re-election.

Democratic primary

Candidates

Nominee
Jim Himes, incumbent U.S. Representative

Republican primary

Candidates

Nominee
Steve Obsitnik, chair and chief executive of Quintel Technology

Eliminated in primary
Chris Meek, the founder of START Now!, a non-profit organization;
David Orner, executive with CIT Group
Richard Wieland, retired businessman,

Declined
Dan Debicella, former state senator and nominee for this seat in 2010

Results
At the Republican state convention on May 18, delegates in the fourth district endorsed Obsitnik. Meek met the threshold required to force a primary, but decided not to challenge the endorsed candidate. Obsitnik lost to Himes.

General election

Endorsements

Predictions

Results

District 5

Incumbent Democrat Chris Murphy has represented the 5th district since 2007. Murphy announced that he will not seek re-election for a fourth term. He instead ran for the U.S. Senate to replace Independent Democrat Joe Lieberman, who retired from the Senate. Murphy won election to the Senate.

Democratic primary
Prior to the Democratic primary, Donovan received the endorsement of the Connecticut Working Families Party and was granted placement on its ballot line for the general election. On August 30, Donovan withdrew his name from the Working Families line to allow the minor party to endorse Elizabeth Esty, the primary winner.

Candidates

Nominee
 Elizabeth Esty, former state representative

Eliminated in primary
 Chris Donovan, speaker of the Connecticut House of Representatives
 Daniel Roberti, public relations firm worker

Disqualified
 Randy Yale, insurance underwriter

Withdrawn
 Mike Williams, advisor to Barack Obama's 2008 presidential campaign

Primary results

Republican primary
At the Republican state convention on May 18, delegates in the fifth district endorsed Roraback. Roraback, Wilson-Foley, Bernier, and Greenberg took part in the August 14 primary.

Candidates

Nominee
 Andrew Roraback, state senator

Eliminated in primary
 Justin Bernier, former member of Governor Jodi Rell's cabinet
 Mark Greenberg, businessman
Lisa Wilson-Foley, businesswoman

Withdrawn
 Mike Clark, chair of the Farmington Town Council and a former FBI agent

Declined
 Sam Caligiuri, former state senator and nominee for this seat in 2010

Endorsements

Primary results

General election

Endorsements

Predictions

Results

References

External links
 Elections and Voting from the Connecticut Secretary of State
United States House of Representatives elections in Connecticut, 2012 at Ballotpedia
 Campaign contributions at OpenSecrets
 Outside spending at the Sunlight Foundation

United States House of Representatives
Connecticut
2012